Phetsomjit Jitmuangnon is a Thai Muay Thai fighter.

Titles and accomplishments

 2016 Channel 7 Stadium 108 lbs Champion
 2019 Rajadamnern Stadium 112 lbs Champion

Fight record

|-  style="background:#fbb;"
| 2021-11-26|| Loss ||align=left| Kiriluang Chor.Hapayak || Muay Thai Moradok Kon Thai || Buriram, Thailand || Decision || 5 ||3:00
|-  style="background:#cfc;"
| 2021-03-25|| Win ||align=left| Satanmuanglek PetchyindeeAcademy || Petchyindee, Rangsit Stadium || Rangsit, Thailand || Decision || 5 ||3:00
|-  style="background:#c5d2ea;"
| 2021-02-21|| Draw||align=left| Oleylek Sor.Kianjai || Muaydeevitheethai, Blue Arena || Samut Prakan, Thailand || Decision || 5 || 3:00
|-  style="background:#cfc;"
| 2020-11-05|| Win||align=left| Chanalert Meenayothin || Muaymanwansuk, Rangsit Stadium || Rangsit, Thailand || Decision || 5 || 3:00
|-  style="background:#cfc;"
| 2020-10-10|| Win||align=left| Phetsuphan Por.Daorungruang  || Jitmuangnon + Sor.KafeMuayThai, Or.Tor.Gor 3 Stadium || Nonthaburi, Thailand || Decision || 5 || 3:00
|-  style="background:#cfc;"
| 2020-09-12|| Win||align=left| Phetsuphan Por.Daorungruang  || Yodmuay Onesongchai, Thanakorn Stadium || Nakhon Pathom, Thailand || Decision || 5 || 3:00
|-  style="background:#fbb;"
| 2020-08-15|| Loss||align=left| Chokpanlan Por.Lakboon  || SuekJaoMuayThai, Siam Omnoi Stadium || Samut Sakhon, Thailand ||Decision ||5 ||3:00
|-  style="background:#cfc;"
| 2020-07-11|| Win ||align=left| Phetsommai Sor.Sommai  || SuekJaoMuayThai, Siam Omnoi Stadium || Samut Sakhon, Thailand|| Decision || 5 || 3:00
|-  style="background:#fbb;"
| 2020-02-28|| Loss||align=left| Phetsommai Sor.Sommai  || Ruamponkonchon Pratan Super Fight || Pathum Thani, Thailand ||Decision ||5 ||3:00
|-  style="background:#cfc;"
| 2020-01-31|| Win ||align=left| Satanmuanglek PetchyindeeAcademy || Phuket Super Fight Real Muay Thai || Mueang Phuket District, Thailand || Decision || 5 ||3:00
|-  style="background:#fbb;"
| 2019-12-19|| Loss||align=left| Phetsuphan Por.Daorungruang  ||  Rajadamnern Stadium || Bangkok, Thailand || Decision || 5 || 3:00 
|-
! style=background:white colspan=9 |
|-  style="background:#cfc;"
| 2019-11-25|| Win ||align=left| Phetsommai Sor.Sommai || Rajadamnern Stadium ||Bangkok, Thailand || Decision (Unanimous) || 5 || 3:00
|-
! style=background:white colspan=9 |
|-  style="background:#FFBBBB;"
| 2019-10-12|| Loss ||align=left| Phetsommai Sor.Sommai || Omnoi Stadium ||Bangkok, Thailand || Decision  || 5 || 3:00
|-
! style=background:white colspan=9 |
|-  style="background:#cfc;"
| 2019-09-10|| Win||align=left| Satanmuanglek PetchyindeeAcademy || Lumpinee Stadium || Bangkok, Thailand || Decision || 5 || 3:00
|-  style="background:#cfc;"
| 2019-08-09|| Win||align=left| Satanmuanglek PetchyindeeAcademy || Lumpinee Stadium || Bangkok, Thailand || Decision || 5 || 3:00
|-  style="background:#c5d2ea;"
| 2019-06-23|| Draw||align=left| Priewpak SorJor.Vichitmuangpadriew || Blue Arena || Samut Prakan, Thailand || Decision || 5 || 3:00
|-  style="background:#fbb;"
| 2019-05-23|| Loss ||align=left| Mohawk Tded99 || Rajadamnern Stadium || Bangkok, Thailand || Decision || 5 || 3:00
|-  style="background:#fbb;"
| 2019-03-21|| Loss ||align=left| Satanmuanglek PetchyindeeAcademy || Rajadamnern Stadium || Bangkok, Thailand || Decision || 5 || 3:00
|-  style="background:#cfc;"
| 2019-02-25|| Win||align=left| Priewpak SorJor.Vichitmuangpadriew || Rajadamnern Stadium || Bangkok, Thailand || Decision || 5 || 3:00
|-  style="background:#cfc;"
| 2019-02-01|| Win ||align=left| Chanalert Meenayothin || Rajadamnern Stadium || Bangkok, Thailand || Decision || 5 || 3:00
|-  style="background:#cfc;"
| 2019-01-04|| Win ||align=left| Phetwanchai Wor.Sangprapai || Lumpinee Stadium || Bangkok, Thailand || Decision || 5 || 3:00
|-  style="background:#cfc;"
| 2018-10-25|| Win ||align=left| Phetwanchai Wor.Sangprapai || Rajadamnern Stadium || Bangkok, Thailand || Decision || 5 || 3:00
|-  style="background:#cfc;"
| 2018-10-04|| Win ||align=left| Ngaopayak OrBorTor.Nonthong || Rajadamnern Stadium || Bangkok, Thailand || Decision || 5 || 3:00
|-  style="background:#cfc;"
| 2018-08-16|| Win ||align=left| Sarawut SorJor.Vichitpaedriw || Rajadamnern Stadium || Bangkok, Thailand || Decision || 5 || 3:00
|-  style="background:#fbb;"
| 2018-07-12|| Loss||align=left| Priewpak SorJor.Vichitmuangpadriew || Rajadamnern Stadium || Bangkok, Thailand || Decision || 5 || 3:00
|-  style="background:#fbb;"
| 2018-06-02|| Loss||align=left| Chokplerngrit Por.Lakboon || Omnoi Stadium ||Bangkok, Thailand || Decision  || 5 || 3:00
|-
! style=background:white colspan=9 |
|-  style="background:#c5d2ea;"
| 2018-04-18|| Draw||align=left| Priewpak SorJor.Vichitmuangpadriew || Rajadamnern Stadium || Bangkok, Thailand || Decision || 5 || 3:00
|-  style="background:#fbb;"
| 2018-03-26|| Loss||align=left| Priewpak SorJor.Vichitmuangpadriew || Rajadamnern Stadium || Bangkok, Thailand || Decision || 5 || 3:00
|-  style="background:#cfc;"
| 2018-02-08|| Win ||align=left| Diesellek Wor.Wanchai || Rajadamnern Stadium || Bangkok, Thailand || Decision || 5 || 3:00
|-  style="background:#cfc;"
| 2018-01-08|| Win ||align=left| Chopper Gor.Sapaothong || Rajadamnern Stadium || Bangkok, Thailand || Decision || 5 || 3:00
|-  style="background:#cfc;"
| 2017-12-17|| Win ||align=left| Pangtor Por.Lakboon || Rangsit Stadium || Thailand || Decision || 5 || 3:00
|-  style="background:#cfc;"
| 2017-11-06|| Win ||align=left| Yokthong Pinsinchai || Rajadamnern Stadium || Bangkok, Thailand || Decision || 5 || 3:00
|-  style="background:#fbb;"
| 2017-09-20|| Loss ||align=left| Diesellek Wor.Wanchai || Rajadamnern Stadium || Bangkok, Thailand || Decision || 5 || 3:00
|-  style="background:#cfc;"
| 2017-08-11|| Win ||align=left| Ngaopayak OrBorTor.Nonthong || Lumpinee Stadium || Bangkok, Thailand || Decision || 5 || 3:00
|-  style="background:#cfc;"
| 2017-05-11|| Win ||align=left| Jaroenpon Popthirathum || Rajadamnern Stadium || Bangkok, Thailand || TKO || 5 ||
|-  style="background:#cfc;"
| 2017-03-26|| Win ||align=left| Phetpanrit Phor.Lakboon || Channel 7 Stadium || Bangkok, Thailand || Decision || 5 || 3:00
|-  style="background:#cfc;"
| 2016-12-16|| Win ||align=left| AkeMueangKhon Mor.KrungthepThonburi  || Lumpinee Stadium || Bangkok, Thailand || Decision || 5 || 3:00
|-  style="background:#cfc;"
| 2016-09-28|| Win ||align=left| Phetpanrit Phor.Lakboon  || Rajadamnern Stadium || Bangkok, Thailand || Decision || 5 || 3:00
|-  style="background:#fbb;"
| 2017-08-06|| Loss ||align=left| Koko Paeminburi || Channel 7 Stadium || Bangkok, Thailand || Decision || 5 || 3:00
|-  style="background:#cfc;"
| 2016-07-10|| Win ||align=left| Pentor Thor.Phan49 || Channel 7 Stadium || Bangkok, Thailand || Decision || 5 || 3:00 
|-
! style=background:white colspan=9 |
|-  style="background:#fbb;"
| 2016-06-17|| Loss ||align=left| Pentor Thor.Phan49 || Lumpinee Stadium || Bangkok, Thailand || Decision || 5 || 3:00
|-  style="background:#cfc;"
| 2016-05-04|| Win ||align=left| Senthanong Tor.Silachai || Rajadamnern Stadium || Bangkok, Thailand || Decision || 5 || 3:00
|-  style="background:#fbb;"
| 2016-04-05|| Loss ||align=left| Nengern Lukjaomaesaivari || Lumpinee Stadium || Bangkok, Thailand || Decision || 5 || 3:00
|-  style="background:#cfc;"
| 2016-03-14|| Win ||align=left| Kaosanit Sor.Dechaphan || Rajadamnern Stadium || Bangkok, Thailand || Decision || 5 || 3:00
|-  style="background:#fbb;"
| 2016-02-12|| Loss ||align=left| Koko Paeminburi || Lumpinee Stadium || Bangkok, Thailand || Decision || 5 || 3:00
|-  style="background:#fbb;"
| 2016-02-03|| Loss ||align=left| Muangchonlek Phor.Suantong || Lumpinee Stadium || Bangkok, Thailand || KO || 4 ||
|-  style="background:#cfc;"
| 2016-01-24|| Win ||align=left| Nuengpayak Phor.Jaroenpeth || Lumpinee Stadium || Bangkok, Thailand || KO || 4 ||
|-  style="background:#fbb;"
| 2015-12-30|| Loss ||align=left| Munggonphet Sor.Kor.Sungaigym || Lumpinee Stadium || Bangkok, Thailand || Decision || 5 || 3:00
|-  style="background:#fbb;"
| 2015-12-22|| Loss ||align=left| Peemai Erawan || Lumpinee Stadium || Bangkok, Thailand || Decision || 5 || 3:00
|-  style="background:#cfc;"
| 2015-10-05|| Win ||align=left| Koko Paeminburi || Rajadamnern Stadium || Bangkok, Thailand || Decision || 5 || 3:00
|-  style="background:#fbb;"
| 2015-12-22|| Loss ||align=left| Peemai Erawan || Lumpinee Stadium || Bangkok, Thailand || Decision || 5 || 3:00
|-  style="background:#cfc;"
| 2015-10-05|| Win ||align=left| Koko Paeminburi || Rajadamnern Stadium || Bangkok, Thailand || Decision || 5 || 3:00
|-  style="background:#cfc;"
| 2015-09-11|| Win ||align=left| Pomphet Sitnumnoi || Lumpinee Stadium || Bangkok, Thailand || Decision || 5 || 3:00
|-  style="background:#fbb;"
| 2015-07-28|| Loss ||align=left| Phetkaowong Aesapansung || Lumpinee Stadium || Bangkok, Thailand || Decision || 5 || 3:00
|-  style="background:#c5d2ea;"
| 2015-04-03|| Draw ||align=left| Phetpanrit Phor.Lakboon || Lumpinee Stadium || Bangkok, Thailand || Decision || 5 || 3:00
|-  style="background:#fbb;"
| 2015-02-16|| Loss ||align=left| Yodbuadaeng SirilakMuaythai || Rajadamnern Stadium || Bangkok, Thailand || Decision || 5 || 3:00
|-  style="background:#cfc;"
| 2015-01-09|| Win ||align=left| Singhaudorn Audaudorn || Lumpinee Stadium || Bangkok, Thailand || Decision || 5 || 3:00
|-  style="background:#cfc;"
| 2014-12-15|| Win ||align=left| Werachat Boonrasi || Rajadamnern Stadium || Bangkok, Thailand || Decision || 5 || 3:00
|-  style="background:#cfc;"
| 2014-10-31|| Win ||align=left| Phetpadriew Sor.Jor.Vichitpadrew || Lumpinee Stadium || Bangkok, Thailand || Decision || 5 || 3:00
|-  style="background:#fbb;"
| 2014-09-30|| Loss ||align=left| Yodbuadaeng SirilakMuaythai || Lumpinee Stadium || Bangkok, Thailand || Decision || 5 || 3:00
|-  style="background:#c5d2ea;"
| 2014-09-09|| Draw ||align=left| Werachat Boonrasi || Lumpinee Stadium || Bangkok, Thailand || Decision || 5 || 3:00
|-
| colspan=9 | Legend:

References

Phetsomjit Jitmuangnon
Living people
Year of birth missing (living people)